Front Page News is the eighth album by rock band Wishbone Ash. It peaked at No. 31 in the UK Albums Chart.

Track listing
All songs written and composed by Martin Turner, Andy Powell, Laurie Wisefield and Steve Upton; except where noted.

Side one
 "Front Page News" – 5:08
 "Midnight Dancer" – 4:24
 "Goodbye Baby Hello Friend" (Wisefield) – 3:51
 "Surface to Air" (Turner) – 4:49
 "714" (Wisefield) – 3:19

Side two
 "Come in from the Rain" (Turner) – 4:38
 "Right or Wrong" (Turner) – 2:50
 "Heart-Beat" (Turner) – 4:21
 "The Day I Found Your Love" – 4:27
 "Diamond Jack" – 4:17

Personnel
Wishbone Ash
Martin Turner – bass guitar, lead vocals except "Goodbye Baby Hello Friend"
Andy Powell – lead, rhythm and acoustic guitars, mandolin, vocals
Laurie Wisefield – lead, 12 string and rhythm guitars, lead vocal on "Goodbye Baby Hello Friend"
Steve Upton – drums

Charts

References

Wishbone Ash albums
1977 albums
Albums with cover art by Hipgnosis
MCA Records albums